The Axel Nixon House is a Queen Anne style cottage in the Fort Street Historic District in Boise, Idaho, USA. The house was designed by Tourtellotte & Co. and constructed in 1903. Features include a roof with flared eaves, flared dormers, and a small porch with Tuscan columns supported by low, flared walls below a decorative sunburst patterned gable. The house has been altered since construction and now serves the community as home to St. John's Food Bank.

Axel Nixon was chief drafter in the General Land Office at Boise.

References

External links
 

		
National Register of Historic Places in Ada County, Idaho
Queen Anne architecture in Idaho